Juan Pablo Rebella (born 1974, in Montevideo – died July 5, 2006) was an Uruguayan film director and screenwriter.

Biography
He attended the Catholic University of Uruguay where he studied social communication.

In 2004 Rebella and Stoll released their second feature film Whisky, at the 2004 Cannes Film Festival and opened to critical acclaim, winning the Regard Original Award.

Rebella shot himself in 2006 at the age of 32. He is buried at Cementerio del Buceo, Montevideo.

References

External links 
 
 Guardian obituary.
  Another obituary

1974 births
2006 suicides
Catholic University of Uruguay alumni
People from Montevideo
Suicides by firearm in Uruguay
Uruguayan film directors
Burials at Cementerio del Buceo, Montevideo
20th-century screenwriters